Maine School Administrative District 8 (MSAD 8) is an operating school district within Maine, covering the town of Vinalhaven.

References

External links

08
08